The Green Cockatoo (a.k.a. Four Dark Hours) is a 1937 British drama film directed by William Cameron Menzies from a story by Graham Greene and shot at Denham Studios. Starring John Mills, René Ray, and Robert Newton, it tells the story of an innocent young woman who arrives in London looking for work and, pursued by both criminals and police, is involved in a headlong series of fights and flights.

Plot
An innocent young woman arrives in London looking for work and walks into an ambush, in which gangsters knife an accomplice who has cheated them. The wounded man staggers with her to a cheap hotel, where he dies after begging her to tell his brother at The Green Cockatoo club. Going there, she is followed by police and hides in an upstairs room. It is that of Jim, the brother, but he does not identify himself to the stranger. When the police leave he escorts her out, but is followed by the gangsters. In another knife fight he gets away and takes her to a safe house. The police turn up, this time to take him to the morgue to identify his brother. When they leave, the gangsters abduct the girl. Looking for the gangsters, Jim turns up and in another fight immobilises them. The police arrive to arrest the gangsters, while Jim and the girl head for the country.

Cast
 John Mills as Jim Connor
 René Ray as Eileen
 Robert Newton as Dave Connor
 Charles Oliver as Terrell, gang boss
 Bruce Seton as Madison, tall henchman
 Julian Vedey as Steve, short henchman
 Allan Jeayes as the Detective Inspector
 Frank Atkinson as Protheroe

References

Bibliography
 Wood, Linda. British Films, 1927-1939. British Film Institute, 1986.

External links
 
 
Review of film at Variety

1937 films
Films directed by William Cameron Menzies
Films scored by Miklós Rózsa
British black-and-white films
Films set in London
1937 crime drama films
British crime drama films
Films shot at Denham Film Studios
20th Century Fox films
1930s English-language films
1930s British films